Arámbarri is a surname. Notable people with the surname include:

Aritz Arambarri (born 1998), Spanish footballer
Jesús Arámbarri (1902–1960), Spanish classical music conductor and composer native to the Basque Country
Mauro Arambarri (born 1995), Uruguayan footballer

See also
Galo Arambarri Boarding House